Salvatore Auteri-Manzocchi (1845 in Palermo – 1924 in Parma) was an Italian opera composer. He was born in Palermo, Italy on 25 December 1845 and died in Parma, Italy on 21 February 1924. He was a student of Pietro Platania at Palermo and Mabellini at Florence. Once of his most successful works was the opera Graziella.

Early life 
He was born the son of opera singer Almerinda Manzocchi on 25 December 1845. Growing up, he demonstrated an aptitude for music.

Works

Operas 

 Dolores (1875)
 Il Negriero (1878)
 Stella (1880)
 Il Conte di Gleichen (1887)
 Graziella (1894)
 Severo Torelli (1903)

References 

1845 births
1924 deaths
Italian opera composers